Wat Chang Hai railway station is a railway station located in Khuan Nori Subdistrict, Khok Pho District, Pattani. The station originally opened as a halt, so there are no passing loops at the station.

Services 
 Rapid No. 171/172 Bangkok-Sungai Kolok-Bangkok
 Local No. 447/448 Surat Thani-Sungai Kolok-Surat Thani
 Local No. 451/452 Nakhon Si Thammarat-Sungai Kolok-Nakhon Si Thammarat
 Local No. 455/456 Nakhon Si Thammarat-Yala-Nakhon Si Thammarat
 Local No. 463/464 Phatthalung-Sungai Kolok-Phatthalung

References 
 
 

Railway stations in Thailand